Gary Francis Winram (5 August 1936 – 29 May 2022) was an Australian  competitive swimmer who specialised primarily in middle- and long-distance freestyle events. As a 20-year-old, he competed in two events at the 1956 Summer Olympics in Melbourne. He finished sixth in the men's 400-metre freestyle final (4:34.9), and eighth in the final of the men's 1500-metre freestyle (19:06.2). Two years later at the 1958 British Empire and Commonwealth Games in Cardiff, Wales, Winram won a silver medal in the 1650-yard freestyle, and a bronze in the 440-yard freestyle.

At the age of 16, he was the first Australian to swim the 1650-yard freestyle in under 19 minutes.

See also
 List of Commonwealth Games medallists in swimming (men)

References

External links
 

1936 births
2022 deaths
Australian male freestyle swimmers
Commonwealth Games bronze medallists for Australia
Commonwealth Games silver medallists for Australia
Olympic swimmers of Australia
Swimmers from Sydney
Swimmers at the 1956 Summer Olympics
Swimmers at the 1958 British Empire and Commonwealth Games
Commonwealth Games medallists in swimming
20th-century Australian people
Medallists at the 1958 British Empire and Commonwealth Games